Alessandro Cortinovis may refer to:
 Alessandro Cortinovis (cyclist)
 Alessandro Cortinovis (footballer)